Newtongrange Star Football Club is a Scottish football club based in the village of Newtongrange, Midlothian. The home ground is New Victoria Park. The facility includes an enclosed pitch with full floodlighting, covered enclosure, changing rooms, with a separate social club. The club also runs an actively used 7-a-side all-weather pitch, also floodlit.

History
Star reached the 1991 Scottish Junior Cup Final, before narrowly losing 1–0 to Auchinleck Talbot in an evenly matched contest.

The SJFA restructured prior to the 2006–07 season, and Star found themselves in the 15-team East Region, South Division. They finished as champions in their first season in the division and were promoted to the Premier League. The following season they just missed promotion to the Superleague which was achieved the following season 2008–09.

While still in the Premier League the Star defeated Superleague teams in their League Cup run, reaching the final against Camelon played at Bathgate. After 90 minutes the games was tied on 1–1. Going to a penalty shootout the Star won with a series of saves from the Star keeper. This was the first silverware for the club in some 20-years. In the Scottish Junior Cup progress was made to the quarter final only to concede to Kirkintilloch Rob Roy.

The first season in the Superleague ended with a creditable fourth position, after having been in second position for much of the season. However the 2010–11 season with a limited squad was less successful resulting in Graeme Armstrong resigning as manager in February 2011. During his five-years at the club Armstrong built a team around a few experienced players but mainly younger players with pace and skill. The teams he put out played an expansive game, with fit players playing at a high tempo, but with discipline, which drew plaudits from the supporters of the club and opposition alike.

John Coughlin, an ex-player and previously manager of senior clubs like St Mirren, Stenhousemuir and Berwick Rangers stepped in on a temporary basis while a permanent appointment was made. On 12 May 2011, Alan Miller, an ex-player and most recently manager of Bonnyrigg Rose was appointed manager. He brought with him his assistants at Bonnyrigg, Ian Black and Finlay Wells.

The team currently plays in the East of Scotland Football League (Conference A), having moved from the SJFA East Region Super League in 2018.

Nitten have been managed by former player Chris King since November 2019.

Current squad
As of 23 January 2021

Out on loan

Staff

Coaching staff

Honours
Scottish Junior Cup
 Winner: 1929–30
SJFA East Region Premier League
 Winners: 2012–13
 Runners-up: 2008–09

Other Honours
 East of Scotland Cup winner: 1906–07, 1925–26, 1929–30, 1957–58, 1958–59, 1974–75, 1976–77, 1979–80, 1981–82, 1991–92, 1996–97, 2010–11
 Midlothian Junior League winner: 1905–06, 1906–07, 1907–08, 1919–20, 1920–21
 Edinburgh & District League winner: 1921–22, 1922–23, 1923–24, 1924–25, 1925–26, 1926–27, 1929–30, 1932–33, 1950–51, 1951–52, 1954–55, 1958–59
 East Region Premier League winner: 1990–91, 1991–92
 East Region B Division winner: 1974–75, 1976–77
 East Region South Division: 2006–07
Dechmont Forklift South League Cup winner: 2008–09
 Brown Cup winner: 1951–52, 1952–53, 1961–62, 1980–81, 1989–90, 1991–92, 1992–93, 1993–94
 St Michael Cup winner: 1927–28, 1950–51, 1961–62
 National Dryborough Cup winner: 1974–75
 Fife & Lothians Cup winner: 1977–78, 1987–88, 1989–90, 1990–91
 East Junior League Cup winner: 1989–90, 1991–92, 1992–93, 1996–97, 2008–09
 Peter Craigie Cup winner: 1989–90, 1991–92

Notable former players
 Bobby Johnstone
 Willie Bauld
 Freddie Glidden
 Dave Mackay
 Alex Munro
 Alex Young
 John Hughes
 John Coughlin
Walter Kidd

References

External links
 Official club site
 The History of Newtongrange Star
 facebook
 twitter

 
Association football clubs established in 1890
Football clubs in Scotland
Scottish Junior Football Association clubs
Football in Midlothian
1890 establishments in Scotland
East of Scotland Football League teams